Herpetogramma thestealis is a species of moth of the family Crambidae. It is found in most of North America.

The wingspan is 29–38 mm. Adults are sexually dimorphic.

The larvae feed on various woody plants, including basswood, hazel, Carolina silverbell and spikenard.

References

Moths described in 1859
Herpetogramma
Moths of North America